Events from the year 1126 in Ireland.

Incumbents
 High King of Ireland: Toirdelbach Ua Conchobair

Events

Diarmaid mac Murchadha becomes King of Munster

Deaths
Mael Ísa Ua Coinne, Irish lawyer

References